Ivis Poleo (born 2 January 1963) is a Venezuelan former swimmer. She competed in two events at the 1976 Summer Olympics.

References

1963 births
Living people
Venezuelan female swimmers
Olympic swimmers of Venezuela
Swimmers at the 1976 Summer Olympics
Place of birth missing (living people)
20th-century Venezuelan women